Infinity Beach is a 2000 science fiction novel by Jack McDevitt. It is a story of a first contact between human and alien civilizations.

It was a 2000 nominee for the Nebula Award for Best Novel.

External links
Featured Review, Catherine Asaro, SFSite
Featured Review, Greg L. Johnson, SFSite
Review, Rambles Magazine
NESFA Members' Reviews
 on official website

 https://www.amazon.com/Infinity-Beach-Jack-McDevitt/dp/0061051233

2000 American novels
2000 science fiction novels
American science fiction novels
Novels by Jack McDevitt
Novels about extraterrestrial life